The genus Quaqua falls within the tribe of plants known collectively as stapeliads. All stapeliads, including Quaqua, are Old World stem succulents.

Species of the genus Quaqua are exceptionally varied and endemic to southwestern Africa, and locally very common in Namaqualand.

Description
Species of Quaqua are usually characterised by having stout, firm, 4 or 5-sided stems bearing conical tubercles which often have a tough, tapering spike at their ends. A few species lack the spikes or have smoothly rounded tubercles.

Quaqua flowers are distinctive from those of other southern African stapeliads for their numerous inflorescences emerging from each stem, especially closer to the ends. There are often ten along each stem, vertically arranged in distichous series. 
The flowers of some species are sweet smelling (faintly of honey or lemon), attractive and rather small (between 7 and 15 mm in diameter). The flowers of other species however, are larger, reaching a maximum diameter of 27 mm and are dark, papillate, and usually have a repulsive odor of urine or excrement. These species are pollinated by flies.

Distribution
In distribution, the genus Quaqua is restricted to the western (winter-rainfall) region of South Africa & Namibia. Its distribution closely mirrors that of related genus Tromotriche.

Species
Plants of the World Online  as of  recognizes the following species:

The species of this genus can be divided into two main groups, based on their floral structure: One group bears flowers singly or in pairs; the other bears flowers in clusters of between 4 and 20. 
The species of the second grouping can in turn be divided into two sections: One with purple to dark-brown flowers that are wider than 25mm (e.g. Quaqua mammillaris or Quaqua pillansii); the other with yellow to cream flowers that are narrower than 25mm.

References

Asclepiadoideae
Apocynaceae genera
Flora of Southern Africa
Taxa named by N. E. Brown